The James Martin House, built c. 1790, is the only remaining representative of a gambrel-roof timber frame dwelling on the lower Eastern Shore of Maryland.  Two other buildings of similar form, Pemberton Hall and Bryan's Manor are brick buildings.  The interior retains much of its original raised-panel woodwork.

It was listed on the National Register of Historic Places in 1996.

References

External links
, including photo from 1994, at Maryland Historical Trust

Houses in Worcester County, Maryland
Houses on the National Register of Historic Places in Maryland
Houses completed in 1790
National Register of Historic Places in Worcester County, Maryland